Rey Mark G. "Mac" Belo (born February 12, 1993) is a Filipino professional basketball player for the Meralco Bolts of the Philippine Basketball Association (PBA).

Early life
Hailing from Midsayap, Cotabato, Belo was born on February 12, 1993. His father is from Panay, Capiz and migrated to Cotabato. He attended St. Mary's Academy of Midsayap for his high school education and later entered the Far Eastern University for his collegiate studies.

College career
During most of his college years, Belo played for his college's basketball team, the FEU Tamaraws which competes at the UAAP.

He was known for his buzzer beating  3-point winning shot against the De La Salle Green Archers in UAAP Season 77 that brought the FEU Tamaraws back to the finals for the first time since 2011 but eventually lost in 3 games to the NU Bulldogs. He was also a member of the Mythical Five for that season.

In UAAP Season 78, he was known for his second buzzer beating winning shot against the Ateneo Blue Eagles 76- 74 that brought FEU back to the finals for the second straight year. He was named the Finals MVP in Game 3 in their win against the UST Growling Tigers. He had cramps that game, yet finished with 23 points and 8 boards, finishing the finals with 17.3 points and 10.3 rebounds a game. Belo was also honored as the Player of the Year in the UAAP-NCAA Collegiate Basketball Awards.

Belo decided to skip UAAP Season 79 on his last year with FEU to focus with his career with the Philippines national basketball team

Professional career

PBA D-League
At the PBA D-League, he played for the Boracay Rum Waves and later with Phoenix-FEU Accelarators.

With Phoenix, Belo led his team to the finals of the 2016 PBA D-League Aspirant's Cup and was named MVP of the tournament. He also broke a league record when he scored 41 points in a game against Caida Tile Masters.

PBA

Blackwater Elite 
Belo was selected by the Blackwater Elite in the special 2016 PBA draft. He scored 17 points, 9 rebounds and 2 assists in his debut. That week, he received his first Player of the Week after the Elite went 2-0 in the Philippine Cup. He was also part of the Mindanao All-Stars in the PBA All-Star Week, but didn't play because of a meniscus tear on his left knee. This injury kept him out for most of the Commissioner's Cup. He returned to playing for them after four months in a 93-118 loss to the San Miguel Beermen in the Governor's Cup.

The next season, Belo was able to play in all three All-Star games, first for Mindanao, then the last two for Gilas Pilipinas. The Elite were able to qualify for the Governor's Cup playoffs that season with the 5th seed, but lost to Magnolia in the first round.

In the 2019 season, he was included in his third All-Star game. The Elite did not qualify for the Philippine Cup playoffs, but made the playoffs for the Commissioner's Cup as the third seed. They lost Game 1 of the best-of three quarterfinals against the Rain or Shine Elasto Painters, but staved off elimination by winning Game 2 with Belo scoring 14 points. Rain or Shine won the third game, knocking off the elite. That would be the highlight of their season as the Elite failed to make the playoffs again for the Governor's Cup. They finished the season with an 11-22 elimination record.

Belo was injured before the start of the 2020 Philippine Cup with a knee injury, but was able to recover during the lockdowns. In their first game, Belo scored 16 points for their first win of the season. They got their second win against the NLEX Road Warriors. He missed a game due to back spasms, but played through it the rest of their games. The Elite ended their season with eight straight losses, finishing 2-9.

Meralco Bolts 
On February 4, 2021, Belo was traded to Meralco Bolts for Baser Amer and Bryan Faundo. He debuted with a career high 27 points with 9 rebounds.

Career statistics

As of the end of 2021 season

PBA season-by-season averages

|-
| align=left | 
| align=left | Blackwater
| 24 || 25.7 || .381 || .296 || .867 || 5.2 || 1.3 || 1.0 || .3 || 10.4
|-
| align=left | 
| align=left | Blackwater
| 31 || 24.5 || .419 || .310 || .721 || 4.1 || 1.5 || .9 || .4 || 10.7
|-
| align=left | 
| align=left | Blackwater
| 36 || 26.2 || .442 || .329 || .741 || 5.9 || 2.0 || 1.0 || .4 || 12.3
|-
| align=left | 
| align=left | Blackwater
| 10 || 23.2 || .382 || .341 || .750 || 5.3 || 1.0 || .8 || .1 || 11.4
|-
| align=left | 
| align=left | Meralco
| 33 || 15.0 || .413 || .265 || .709 || 3.5 || .8 || .4 || .4 || 6.5
|-class=sortbottom
| align="center" colspan=2 | Career
| 134 || 22.7 || .415 || .309 || .763 || 4.7 || 1.4 || .8 || .4 || 10.1

College

Elimination Rounds

Playoffs

National team career
Belo has played for the Philippines national basketball team in various international basketball tournaments such as the 2013 and 2015 Southeast Asian Games, the 2015 SEABA Championship, the 2016 SEABA Cup, and the 2016 FIBA Asia Challenge. He could have been a part of the Gilas roster for the 2017 SEABA Championship if not for a meniscus tear on his left knee. He was also played for the Philippines in the 2017 Jones Cup.

Belo was also part of the Philippine squad that participated at the 2016 FIBA 3x3 World Championships.

References

1993 births
Living people
Blackwater Bossing players
People from Cotabato
Philippine Basketball Association All-Stars
Philippines men's national basketball team players
Filipino men's basketball players
Philippines national 3x3 basketball team players
Filipino men's 3x3 basketball players
Power forwards (basketball)
Small forwards
Southeast Asian Games gold medalists for the Philippines
Southeast Asian Games competitors for the Philippines
Southeast Asian Games medalists in basketball
FEU Tamaraws basketball players
Visayan people
Competitors at the 2013 Southeast Asian Games
Competitors at the 2015 Southeast Asian Games
Blackwater Bossing draft picks
Meralco Bolts players